This list of comics publishing companies lists companies, specifically publishing companies who primarily publish comics. Comic art is an art medium used to present ideas or stories via images. The images are usually arranged in panels in a sequence that conveys the story. Sounds are expressed using speech balloons and onomatopoeia. European comics have existed since 1837, when Swiss artist Rodolphe Töpffer published Histoire de M. Vieux Bois. The oldest comic publishing company on this list is the now-defunct book publishing company, David McKay Publications that was founded in 1882 and published comics from 1935 to 1950. Most comic publishing companies were established in the United States of America where comics became popular in the mid-1900s.

Publishers

All articles with unsourced statements
Articles with unsourced statements from February 2012
{| class="wikitable sortable"
|+ Comics publishing companies
|-
! style="background:#cfcfcf;" align="center" | Name
! align="center" | Country
! colspan="2" align="center" | Active
! class="unsortable" align="center" | Notes 
|-

 

|}

See also

 List of Golden Age comics publishers
 List of manga publishers

References

Works cited

 Bell, John. Invaders from the North. Dundurn Press, 2007. 
 Sanford, Jay Allen. "Two Men and their Comic Books," San Diego Reader (19. August 2004)
 Booker, M. Keith. Encyclopedia of Comic Books and Graphic Novels. ABC-CLIO, 2010. 
 Gabilliet, Jean-Paul. Of Comics and Men: A Cultural History of American Comic Books. translated by Beaty, Bart; and Nguyen, Nick. University Press of Mississippi, 2010. 
 
Voger, Mark; and Schaffenberger, Kurt. Hero Gets Girl!: The Life & Art of Kurt Schaffenberger. TwoMorrows Publishing, 2003.